Alfonso IX (15 August 117123 or 24 September 1230) was King of León and Galicia  from the death of his father Ferdinand II in 1188 until his own death.

He took steps towards modernizing and democratizing his dominion and founded the University of Salamanca in 1212. In 1188 he summoned the first parliament reflecting the fullest representation of the citizenry ever seen in Western Europe, the Cortes of León.

Alfonso took part in the Reconquista, conquering several territories within Extremadura, capturing Mérida and Badajoz in 1230, which allowed for the eventual conquest of Seville during the reign of his son Ferdinand III. He was also involved in numerous conflicts with Pope Celestine III, being interdicted on account of the nature of his marriages.

Biography

Early life 
Alfonso was born in Zamora. He was the only son of King Ferdinand II of León and Urraca of Portugal. His father was the younger son of Alfonso VII of León and Castile, who divided his kingdoms between his sons, which set the stage for conflict in the family until the kingdoms were re-united by Alfonso IX's son Ferdinand III of Castile.

Alfonso IX had great difficulty in obtaining the throne through his given birthright.  In July 1188 his cousin Alfonso VIII of Castile required the younger Alfonso to recognize the elder as overlord in exchange for recognizing the younger's authority in León.

Reign 
The convening of the Cortes de León in the cloisters of the Basilica of San Isidoro would be one of the most important events of Alfonso's reign. The difficult economic situation at the beginning of his reign compelled Alfonso to raise taxes on the underprivileged classes, leading to protests and a few town revolts. In response, the king summoned the Cortes, an assembly of nobles, clergy and representatives of cities, and subsequently faced demands for compensatory spending and greater external control and oversight of royal expenditures. Alfonso's convening of the Cortes is considered by many historians, including John Keane, to be instrumental to the formation of democratic parliaments across Europe. Note that Iceland had already held what may have been what is Europe's first parliament, the Þingvellir, in 930. However, the Cortes' 1188 session predates the first session of the Parliament of England, which occurred in the thirteenth century.

In spite of the democratic precedent represented by the Cortes and the founding of the University of Salamanca, Alfonso is often chiefly remembered for the difficulties his successive marriages caused between him with Pope Celestine III. He was first married in 1191 to his first cousin, Theresa of Portugal, who bore him two daughters, and a son who died young. The marriage was declared null by the papal legate Cardinal Gregory for consanguinity.

After Alfonso VIII of Castile was defeated at the Battle of Alarcos, Alfonso IX invaded Castile with the aid of Muslim troops. He was summarily excommunicated by Pope Celestine III. In 1197, Alfonso IX married his first cousin once removed, Berengaria of Castile, to cement peace between León and Castile. For this second act of consanguinity, the king and the kingdom were placed under interdict by representatives of the pope. In 1198, Pope Innocent III declared Alfonso and Berengaria's marriage invalid, but they stayed together until 1204.  The annulment of this marriage by the pope drove the younger Alfonso to again attack his cousin in 1204, but treaties made in 1205, 1207, and 1209 each forced him to concede further territories and rights.  The treaty in 1207 is the first existing public document in the Castilian dialect.

The Pope was, however, compelled to modify his measures by the threat that, if the people could not obtain the services of religion, they would not support the clergy, and that heresy would spread. The king was left under interdict personally, but to that he showed himself indifferent, and he had the support of his clergy.

In 1211 Alfonso IX of León and Galicia gave the castle of Alcañices to the Templar Order, where inhabitants celebrated the great victories of the order.

Death 
Alfonso IX of León and Galicia died on 24 September 1230. His death was particularly significant in that his son, Ferdinand III of Castile, who was already the King of Castile, also inherited the thrones of León and Galicia from his father. This was thanks to the negotiations of his mother, Berengaria, who convinced her stepdaughters to renounce their claim on the throne. In an effort to quickly consolidate his power over León, Ferdinand III abandoned a military campaign to capture the city of Jaén immediately upon hearing news of his father's death and traveled to León to be crowned king.  This coronation united the Kingdoms of León and Castile which would go on to dominate the Iberian Peninsula.

Marriages and issue 
Alfonso IX married twice, both times to near relatives, and remarkably, both of his marriages were annulled for consanguinity. Apart from the eight children born of these two marriages, Alfonso also fathered numerous progeny upon other women of lower rank.

Marriages and legitimate issue 
In 1191, Alfonso married his first cousin Theresa of Portugal, who was his mother's brother's daughter. Theresa was the daughter of King Sancho I of Portugal and Queen Dulce of Aragon. The marriage was annulled five years later, on grounds of consanguinity but three children had been born by then, being:
 Sancha (1191before 1243) unmarried and without issue. She and her sister Dulce became nuns or retired to the monastery of San Guillermo Villabuena in León, where she died before 1243.
 Ferdinand (1192/11931214), unmarried and without issue.
 Dulce (1193/11941248).

On 17 November 1197, Alfonso IX married his first cousin once removed, the infanta Berengaria of Castile. Berengeria was the daughter of King Alfonso VIII of Castile and his wife Queen Leonor of England. Her paternal grandfather, Sancho III of Castile, had been a brother of Alfonso's own father Ferdinand II of León. Thus, both Alfonso IX and Berengaria belonged to the same dynasty or family. The marriage was annulled on grounds of consanguinity, but not before five children had been born, namely:
 Eleanor (119811 November 1202).
 Constance (died in 1242), became a nun at the Abbey of Santa María la Real de Las Huelgas, Burgos, where she died.
 Ferdinand III of Castile (1199/12011252). King of Castile in 1217 after the death of Henry I of Castile and of León  in 1230 after the death of his father.
 Alfonso  (died in 1272), Lord of Molina jure uxoris due to his first marriage to Mafalda González de Lara.
 Berengaria of León (died in 1237), in 1224 married John of Brienne,

Affairs and illegitimate issue 
Alfonso also fathered many illegitimate children. After the annulment of his first marriage and before marrying for the second time, he had a relationship which lasted about two years with Inés Íñiguez de Mendoza, daughter of Iñigo López de Mendoza and María García. This affair produced a daughter born around 1197:
 Urraca Alfonso, the wife of Lope Díaz II de Haro, Lord of Biscay.

Alfonso had another relationship afterwards with a noblewoman from Galicia, Estefanía Pérez de Faiam. She was the daughter of Pedro Menéndez Faiam, who confirmed several royal charters of King Alfonso IX, and the granddaughter of Menendo Faiam, who also confirmed several diplomas issued in Galicia as of 1155 by King Ferdinand II of León. In 1211, Alfonso gave her lands in Orense where her family, as can be inferred from her last will dated 1250, owned many estates, as well as in the north of Portugal. After the relationship ended, Estefanía married Rodrigo Suárez with whom she had further issue. In her will, she asked to be buried in the Monastery of Fiães in northern Portugal. Alfonso IX and Estefanía were the parents of possibly two sons, but definitely of one, being:
 Ferdinand Alfonso of León (born in 1211), died young.

According to Spanish historian Julio González, after his relationship with Estefanía, the king had a lover from Salamanca, of unknown origin, whose name was Maura and with whom he had issue:
 Fernando Alfonso de León (/1218Salamanca, 10 January 1278), archdeacon of the Cathedral of Santiago de Compostela, who had issue with Aldara de Ulloa.

Alfonso also had a relationship with a noblewoman from Portugal, Aldonza Martínez de Silva, daughter of Martim Gomes da Silva and his wife Urraca Rodrigues, which lasted from 1214 to 1218. Three children were born to them:
 Rodrigo, lord of Aliger and Castro del Río, and Adelantado of the March of Andalusia,  he married Inés Rodríguez, daughter of Rodrigo Fernández de Valduerna, Lord of Cabrera and alférez of King Alfonso IX.
 Aldonza (died after 1267). Married count Pedro Ponce de Cabrera, and had issue.  They are the ancestors of the Ponce de León family.
 Teresa Alfonso of León, the wife of Nuño González de Lara el Bueno.

King Alfonso's most long-lasting extra-marital relationship, which began in 1218 and lasted until his death in 1230, was with Teresa Gil de Soverosa. A member of the Portuguese nobility, Teresa was the daughter of Gil Vasques de Soverosa and his first wife María Aires de Fornelos. They had four children, all of them born between 1218 and 1230:
 Sancha (d. 1270). Married Simon Ruiz, Lord of Los Cameros. She later became a nun at the convent of Santa Eufemia de Cozuelos which she had founded.
 María (died after July 1275). Her first marriage was with Álvaro Fernández de Lara. She was then the concubine of her nephew King Alfonso X of Castile and, according to the Count of Barcelos, her second husband was Suero Arias de Valladares.
 Martín (died 1268/1272), married to Maria Mendes de Sousa, founders of the Monastery of Sancti-Spíritus, Salamanca. There was no issue from this marriage.
 Urraca (d. after 1252). First married García Romeu, and then Pedro Núñez de Guzmán.

Although Alfonso IX is supposed to have had another son, Pedro Alfonso de León, there is no documentary proof that he was the king's son or that he was the Grand Master of the Order of Santiago.

Notes

References

Bibliography

Further reading 
 Sánchez Rivera, Jesús Ángel, "Configuración de una iconografía singular: la venerable doña Sancha Alfonso, comendadora de Santiago", Anales de Historia del Arte, nº 18 (2008), Madrid, Universidad Complutense de Madrid, pp. 167–209.
 Szabolcs de Vajay, "From Alfonso VIII to Alfonso X" in Studies in Genealogy and Family History in Tribute to Charles Evans on the Occasion of his Eightieth Birthday, 1989, pp. 366–417.

1171 births
1230 deaths
People from Zamora, Spain
Leonese infantes
12th-century Leonese monarchs
Roman Catholic monarchs
12th-century Galician monarchs
People excommunicated by the Catholic Church
Castilian House of Burgundy
Royalty and nobility with disabilities
13th-century Leonese monarchs